The following outline is provided as an overview of and topical guide to the real-world history and notable fictional elements of J. R. R. Tolkien's fantasy universe. It covers materials created by Tolkien; the works on his unpublished manuscripts, by his son Christopher Tolkien; and films, games and other media created by other people.

Middle-earth – fantasy setting created by Tolkien, home to hobbits, orcs, ents, dragons, and many other races and creatures.

Primary sources

Authors 
 J. R. R. Tolkien
 Christopher Tolkien

Published works

By J. R. R. Tolkien 

 The Hobbit (1937)
 2nd Edition (1951) revised to align with The Lord of the Rings
 3rd Edition (1966) revised to assert copyright in US
 The Lord of the Rings
 The Fellowship of the Ring (1954)
 The Shadow of the Past
 The Council of Elrond
 The Two Towers (1954)
 The Return of the King (1955)
 The Scouring of the Shire - a "novelistic" chapter
 The Tale of Aragorn and Arwen
 The Adventures of Tom Bombadil (1962)
 Revised edition (2014) with addition of original poems, sources and images, and commentary by Christina Scull and Wayne G. Hammond 
 The Road Goes Ever On (1967) – music by Donald Swann, penmanship by Tolkien. See also Audio recordings
 Revised edition (1978) – including a setting for Bilbo's Last Song

 Posthumously published
Bilbo's Last Song (1974) – Dutch translation published 1973
 Guide to the Names in The Lord of the Rings (1975) – also known as "Nomenclature of The Lord of the Rings"
The Silmarillion (1977)
Ainulindalë
Pictures by J. R. R. Tolkien (1979) – text by Christopher Tolkien. Most of these pictures had been previously published in calendars by Ballantine Books (1973) and George Allen & Unwin (1974, 1976-1979), some of them coloured by H. E. Riddett.
Unfinished Tales (1980)
Narn i Chîn Húrin
The Quest of Erebor
J. R. R. Tolkien: Artist and Illustrator (1995) – text by Wayne G. Hammond and Christina Scull
The Art of The Hobbit by J. R. R. Tolkien (2011) – text by Wayne G. Hammond and Christina Scull
The Art of The Lord of the Rings by J. R. R. Tolkien (2015) – text by Wayne G. Hammond and Christina Scull

Edited by Douglas A. Anderson
 The Annotated Hobbit (1988) – text of The Hobbit, with many related texts by Tolkien, edited and with commentary by Douglas A. Anderson (revised edition 2002)

Edited by Humphrey Carpenter, assisted by Christopher Tolkien

 The Letters of J. R. R. Tolkien (1981) – selected, introduced and edited by Humphrey Carpenter, assisted by Christopher Tolkien

Edited by Carl F. Hostetter 

 The Nature of Middle-earth (2021) – essays and fragments, including on Elvish linguistics, with commentary by the scholar Carl F. Hostetter

Edited by John D. Rateliff 

 The History of The Hobbit (2007) - 2 volumes on the construction of The Hobbit with commentary by the scholar John D. Rateliff

Edited by Christopher Tolkien 

These works present extended selections of Tolkien's legendarium (the large body of documents relating to The Silmarillion), with extensive notes and posthumous editing by his son Christopher. The separate 4-volume body of his comments on the drafts of The Lord of the Rings is included as volumes 6-9.

The History of Middle-earth 

 Early legendarium
1 The Book of Lost Tales 1 (1983)
2 The Book of Lost Tales 2 (1984)
3 The Lays of Beleriand (1985)
4 The Shaping of Middle-earth (1986)
5 The Lost Road and Other Writings (1987)

 The History of The Lord of the Rings
6 [1] The Return of the Shadow (1988)
7 [2] The Treason of Isengard (1989)
8 [3] The War of the Ring (1990)
9 [4] Sauron Defeated (1992)

 The later Silmarillion
10 [1] Morgoth's Ring (1993)
11 [2] The War of the Jewels (1994)

 Further details
12 The Peoples of Middle-earth (1996)

Other stories 

 The Tolkien Reader and Tales from the Perilous Realm both reprint The Adventures of Tom Bombadil

Additional materials from the legendarium, with Christopher Tolkien's commentary.

 The Children of Húrin (2007)
 Beren and Lúthien (2017)
 The Fall of Gondolin (2018)

Audio recordings

 Poems and Songs of Middle Earth (1967) – poems read by Tolkien; songs sung by William Elvin, accompanied by composer Donald Swann (as published in The Road Goes Ever On)
 J. R. R. Tolkien Reads and Sings his The Hobbit & The Lord of the Rings (1975), Caedmon TC 1477, TC 1478 (based on an August, 1952 recording by George Sayer)

Graphical works 
 Tolkien's artwork 
 Tolkien's maps 
 Tolkien's scripts 
 Cirth
 Sarati
 Tengwar

Translations
 Translations of The Hobbit
 Translations of The Lord of the Rings
 Translation of The Lord of the Rings into Swedish
 Translations of The Lord of the Rings into Russian

Adaptations and developments

Maps

 A Map of Middle-earth, meaning either of two posters:
 by Barbara Remington (1965)
 by Pauline Baynes (1970)
 The Atlas of Middle-earth (1981, revised ed 1991) by Karen Wynn Fonstad
 Journeys of Frodo: An Atlas of J. R. R. Tolkien's The Lord of the Rings (1981) by Barbara Strachey

Spoken word 
 The Hobbit (1974) – Nicol Williamson recorded an abridged, dramatic version for Decca Records on the Argo label
 The Lord of the Rings (1990) – unabridged recording by Rob Inglis for Recorded Books
 The Hobbit (1991) – unabridged recording by Rob Inglis for Recorded Books
 The Children of Húrin (2007) – Christopher Lee recorded an unabridged audiobook
 The Hobbit (2020) – Andy Serkis live-streamed an unabridged reading to raise money for NHS Charities Together
 The Hobbit (2020) – unabridged recording by Andy Serkis for HarperCollinsUK and Recorded Books
 The Lord of the Rings (2021) – unabridged recording by Andy Serkis for HarperCollinsUK and Recorded Books

Radio 
 The Lord of the Rings (1955) – BBC: six 45-minute episodes for The Fellowship of the Ring, then six 30-minute episodes for all of The Two Towers and The Return of the King, adapted by Terence Tiller
 The Hobbit (1968) – BBC: eight half-hour episodes, adapted by Michael Kilgarriff
 The Lord of the Rings (1979) – National Public Radio: totalling over 11 hours, adapted by Bernard Mayes
 The Lord of the Rings (1981) – BBC: 26 half-hour instalments, later re-cut to 13 hour-long instalments, adapted by Brian Sibley and Michael Bakewell
 Der Herr der Ringe (1991) – Südwestrundfunk and Westdeutscher Rundfunk: German adaptation of The Lord of the Rings in 30 half-hour episodes, by Peter Steinbach

Films 

 The Hobbit (1967) – Gene Deitch's short animated adaptation
 The Hobbit (1977) – an animated musical television special by Rankin/Bass
 The Lord of the Rings (1978) – an animated film of the first half of the book by Ralph Bakshi
 The Return of the King (1980) – the animated sequel to 1977's The Hobbit
 Khraniteli (1991) - a "lost" Russian television play, now recovered
 Hobitit (1993) - a Finnish rendering of the Hobbits' journey in The Lord of the Rings
 The Lord of the Rings film series – the live-action trilogy by Peter Jackson
 The Lord of the Rings: The Fellowship of the Ring (2001)
 The Lord of the Rings: The Two Towers (2002)
 The Lord of the Rings: The Return of the King (2003)
 The Hobbit film series – Jackson's three-part prequel to his The Lord of the Rings series
 The Hobbit: An Unexpected Journey (2012)
 The Hobbit: The Desolation of Smaug (2013)
 The Hobbit: The Battle of the Five Armies (2014)

Stage 
Rob Inglis wrote and performed one-man adaptations of The Hobbit and The Lord of the Rings starting in the 1970s
Lord of the Rings (2006) – Musical staged in Toronto, re-written for London in 2007

Television 
 The Hobbit (1979) – children's program Jackanory broadcast ten 15-minute episodes
 The Lord of the Rings: The Rings of Power (2022) – prequel series by Amazon Studios

Games

Tabletop games 

Middle-earth Role Playing (1984) – Iron Crown Enterprises
Lord of the Rings Adventure Game (1991) – Iron Crown Enterprises
The Lord of the Rings Roleplaying Game (2002)  –Decipher, Inc.
The One Ring: Adventures over the Edge of the Wild (2011) – Cubicle 7
Adventures in Middle-earth (2016) – OGL supplement by Cubicle 7

Video games 

The Hobbit (1982)
Elendor (1991)
The Lord of the Rings: The Two Towers (2002)
The Hobbit (2003)
The Lord of the Rings: The Return of the King (2003)
The Lord of the Rings: The Third Age (2004)
The Lord of the Rings: The Battle for Middle-earth (2004)
The Lord of the Rings: The Third Age (Game Boy Advance) (2004)
The Lord of the Rings: The Battle for Middle-earth II (2006)
The Lord of the Rings: The Battle for Middle-earth II: The Rise of the Witch-king (2006)
The Lord of the Rings: The White Council (2007; cancelled)
The Lord of the Rings Online: Shadows of Angmar (2007)
The Lord of the Rings: Conquest (2009)
The Lord of the Rings: Tactics (2009)
The Lord of the Rings: Aragorn's Quest (2010)
The Lord of the Rings: War in the North (2011)
Guardians of Middle-earth (2012)
Lego The Lord of the Rings (2012)
Lego The Hobbit (2014)
Middle-earth: Shadow of Mordor (2014)
Middle-earth: Shadow of War (2017)

Parodies 
Bored of the Rings (1969) – Harvard Lampoon novel
Hordes of the Things (1980) – BBC radio series
Bored of the Rings (1985) – Delta 4 video game
The Boggit: Bored Too (1986) – Delta 4 video game
Muddle Earth (2003) – children's novel by Paul Stewart
Fellowship! (2004) – musical

Geography

Cosmology of Eä 

 The Two Trees

Continents of Arda 
 Middle-earth
 Númenor
 Valinor (on Aman)

Nations and regions 

 Beleriand
 Gondor
 Harad
 Lothlórien
 Mordor
 Rohan
 The Shire

Natural features 

 The Lonely Mountain
 Mirkwood
 The Old Forest

Cities and other populated places 

 Bag End
 Bree
 Esgaroth
 Isengard
 Moria
 Rivendell

History

Artefacts

 Mithril
 The Palantíri
 Rings of Power
 The One Ring
 The Three Rings
 The Silmarils
 Weapons and armour

Events

 First Age
 Sundering of the Elves

 Third Age 
 Battle of Helm's Deep
 Battle of the Pelennor Fields
 Battle of the Morannon
 The Scouring of the Shire

Characters

First Age
House of Finwë
 Finwë
 Fëanor
 Maedhros
 Finrod Felagund
 Galadriel
 Glorfindel

House of Elwë and Olwë
 Thingol
 Lúthien

House of Marach
 Húrin
 Túrin Turambar
 Tuor
 Eärendil and Elwing
 Elrond
 Arwen

Others
 Beren
 Sauron
 Ungoliant

Second Age

 Elendil
 Gil-galad
 Isildur

Third Age
Thorin and Company
 Thorin Oakenshield
 Balin
 Bilbo Baggins
 Gandalf

The Fellowship of the Ring
 Frodo Baggins
 Samwise Gamgee
 Merry Brandybuck
 Pippin Took
 Aragorn
 Boromir
 Gandalf
 Legolas
 Gimli

Wizards:
 Gandalf
 Radagast
 Saruman

Elves
 Arwen
 Galadriel
 Glorfindel
 Legolas
 Thranduil

Men
 Aragorn
 Bard
 Boromir
 Denethor
 Éomer
 Éowyn
 Faramir
 Gríma Wormtongue
 Théoden

Other characters
 Barrow-wight
 Beorn
 Goldberry
 Gollum
 Old Man Willow
 Shelob
 Treebeard
 Tom Bombadil
 Watcher in the Water

Culture

Races 

Ainur
 Valar
 Maiar
 Balrogs
Wizards

Men
 Drúedain
 Dúnedain

Monsters
 Dragons
 Nazgûl
 Orcs
 Trolls
 Wargs

Other

 Dwarves
 Eagles
 Elves
 Ents
 Hobbits

Languages

Elvish languages
 Quenya
 Sindarin

Other
 Adûnaic
 Khuzdul
 Black Speech

Folklore and poetry

 A Elbereth Gilthoniel
 A Walking Song
 Namárië
 Song of Eärendil
 Errantry
 Fastitocalon
 The Lay of Leithian
 The Lay of the Children of Húrin
 The Man in the Moon Stayed Up Too Late
 The Road Goes Ever On
 The Sea-Bell
 The Tale of Aragorn and Arwen
 Beren and Lúthien

Analysis

Influences 

 J. R. R. Tolkien's influences
 Beowulf
 Nodens
 Ring of Silvianus
 Sigelwara Land

Components 

 Artwork
 Family trees
 Heraldry
 for Tolkien's invented Languages, see above
 Maps
 Poetry
 see above for individual poems

Literary devices 

 Character pairing
 Frame stories
 Impression of depth
 Interlacing
 Narrative structure
 Prose style

Themes 

 Addiction to power
 Ancestry as guide to character
 Architecture
 Beowulf
 Christianity
 Decline and fall
 England
 Environmentalism
 First World War
 Frame stories
 Heroism
 Languages
 Luck and fate
 Magic
 Medieval
 Music
 Naming of weapons
 Northern courage
 Paganism
 Plants
 Psychological journeys
 Quests
 Race
 Sentience dilemma
 Sexuality
 Shakespeare
 Sound and language
 Time
 Trees and forests
 Women

Music 

 The Tolkien Ensemble

Scholarship

Institutions 

 The Tolkien Society
 The Mythopoeic Society
 Elvish Linguistic Fellowship
 Marion E. Wade Center
 Signum University

Journals 

 Journal of Tolkien Research
 Mallorn
 Mythlore
 Tolkien Studies
 Vinyar Tengwar

Scholars 

 Douglas A. Anderson
 Nicholas Birns 
 Stratford Caldecott
 Jane Chance
 Patrick Curry
 Michael D. C. Drout
 Jason Fisher 
 Verlyn Flieger
 John Garth 
 Glen GoodKnight 
 Wayne G. Hammond
 Stuart D. Lee 
 Jared Lobdell 
 Gergely Nagy 
 Corey Olsen 
 John D. Rateliff
 Fleming Rutledge 
 Christina Scull
 Elizabeth Solopova
 Sandra Ballif Straubhaar 
 Richard C. West 
 Ralph C. Wood

Biographical works 

 J. R. R. Tolkien: A Biography (1977) – by Humphrey Carpenter
 Tolkien and the Great War (2003) – by John Garth
 The Ring of Words: Tolkien and the Oxford English Dictionary (2006) – by  Peter Gilliver, Jeremy Marshall and Edmund Weiner

Works 

 Tolkien: A Look Behind "The Lord of the Rings" (1969) – by Lin Carter (revised 2003 by Adam Roberts)
 The Complete Guide to Middle-earth (1971) – ed. Robert Foster (revised 1978, 2001)
 Master of Middle-Earth (1972) – by Paul H. Kocher
 Tolkien's Art: 'A Mythology for England' (1979) – by Jane Chance
 The Road to Middle-Earth (1982) – by Tom Shippey (revised 1993, 2005)
 Splintered Light (1983) – by Verlyn Flieger
 J. R. R. Tolkien: Author of the Century (2000) – by Tom Shippey
 Tolkien's Legendarium: Essays on The History of Middle-earth (2000) – eds Verlyn Flieger and Carl F. Hostetter 
 Tolkien: A Cultural Phenomenon (2003) – by Brian Rosebury
 The Lord of the Rings: A Reader's Companion (2005) – by Wayne G. Hammond and Christina Scull
 The J. R. R. Tolkien Companion and Guide (2006) – by Wayne G. Hammond and Christina Scull
 The J. R. R. Tolkien Encyclopedia (2006) – ed. Michael D. C. Drout
 A Companion to J. R. R. Tolkien (2014) – ed. Stuart D. Lee
 Tolkien: Maker of Middle-earth (2018) – by Catherine McIlwaine
 The Worlds of J. R. R. Tolkien (2020) – by John Garth

See also

 List of The Hobbit characters
 List of original characters in The Lord of the Rings film series

External links 

 Tolkien Gateway – wiki about Middle-earth and Tolkien.
 The Tolkien Meta-FAQ – answers to commonly asked questions about Tolkien and Middle-earth.
 J. R. R. Tolkien Collection at Marquette University – manuscripts of The Hobbit and The Lord of the Rings, and related documents

Outline

Middle-earth